KKCB (105.1 FM, "B105") is a radio station in Duluth, Minnesota, owned by Townsquare Media, airing a country music format. The studios and offices are with its three other sister stations at 14 E. Central Entrance, on the west side of Duluth. The station was WAVC during the 1980s, and previously a beautiful music outlet as WGGR.

External links
KKCB official website

Country radio stations in the United States
Radio stations in Duluth, Minnesota
Radio stations in Superior, Wisconsin
Townsquare Media radio stations
Radio stations established in 1966
1966 establishments in Minnesota